Kentucky Route 3005 serves as a northern bypass of Elizabethtown. Locally, it is known as Ring Road. It originates outside the western limits of Elizabethtown at an interchange with Western Kentucky Parkway. The road then takes a wide circuit to the north of the city, eventually entering the city limits. Its eastern terminus is at U.S. 62, here known as Mulberry Street, within the city limits and approximately 1 mile (1.6 km) west of Interstate 65.

Efforts are underway to extend the road to an interchange with Interstate 65.

Route description
KY 3005 begins at the Western Kentucky Parkway southwest of Elizabethtown in Hardin County, heading northwest on four-lane divided Ring Road. From the western terminus, the roadway heads northwest through farmland with some development, coming to an intersection with US 62. Following this intersection, the route continues north as a five-lane road with a center left-turn lane through agricultural and industrial areas, crossing a Paducah and Louisville Railway line. KY 3005 heads north-northeast through more commercial development, intersecting KY 1357. The road runs north through farmland with some woods, curving northeast and reaching a junction with KY 1600. After this intersection, the route passes through more rural areas before heading east into business areas and intersecting US 31W. KY 3005 runs past more commercial establishments before heading through a mix of farmland and woodland with some development. The road comes to an intersection with KY 251 and makes a turn to the south, passing through areas of residences and businesses. KY 3005 comes to its eastern terminus at an intersection with US 62/KY 61 in the eastern part of Elizabethtown. The State of Kentucky is developing plans to extend Ring Road on the south side of Elizabethtown west to I-65 and US 31W.

Major intersections

References

External links
 

3005
3005
3005
Beltways in the United States